The white-tailed tyrannulet (Mecocerculus poecilocercus) is a species of bird in the family Tyrannidae.

It is found in Colombia, Ecuador, and Peru. Its natural habitat is subtropical or tropical moist montane forests.

References

External links
Summary of white-tailed tyrannulet
Picture of white-tailed tyrannulet

white-tailed tyrannulet
Birds of the Northern Andes
white-tailed tyrannulet
white-tailed tyrannulet
white-tailed tyrannulet
Taxonomy articles created by Polbot